Jāmi’ah al-Ahmadīyyah ("the Ahmadiyya University") is an International Islamic seminary and educational institute with campuses in Pakistan, United Kingdom, India, Ghana, Canada, Germany, Nigeria, Indonesia, Bangladesh, Malaysia, Tanzania, Sri Lanka, Sierra Leone, and Kenya. In addition, there are affiliated Mu'alameen centers (Missionary Training Centres) in Pakistan and Madagascar. Founded in 1906 as a Section in Madrassa Talim ul Islam (later Talim-ul-Islam College) by Mirza Ghulam Ahmad of Qadian, the founder of the Ahmadiyya Muslim Community, it is the main centre of the Ahmadiyya Muslim Community for Islamic learning.

History
The foundations of Jamia Ahmadiyya were laid by Mirza Ghulam Ahmad, founder of the Ahmadiyya Muslim Community himself, when he expressed the need for a madrassa for Ahmadi Muslims so that a new generation of Ahmadi scholars could be trained. This led to the creation of Talim-ul-Islam College in Qadian, India, in 1898. The theology section was later separated and inaugurated as Jamia Ahmadiyya Qadian on 20 May 1928 by Mirza Bashir-ud-Din Mahmood Ahmad, Khalifatul Masih II of the Ahmadiyya Muslim Community.
Following the Partition of the Indian subcontinent, the Community relocated its headquarters to Rabwah, Pakistan. Keeping in view the needs of the Community in Pakistan, Jamia Ahmadiyya Rabwah was established. Since then, due to the exponential growth of the Community around the globe, campuses have been opened in many countries throughout the world.

Degree and curriculum
Two types of degrees are offered in most Jamias.
 Shahid degree: This is the seven-year course. In some Jamias (e.g. in United Kingdom) this is the only course offered.
 Mubashar degree: This is a four-year course offered in many Jamias.
Some Jamias have associated Mu'allam courses as well. This course is shorter than the Shahid degree.

The curriculum for the Jamia Ahmadiyyas around the globe is nearly same and is organised and compiled by scholars of the Ahmadiyya Muslim Community. The only differences are in the regional languages taught which are according to the locations of the institutions.

The curriculum generally consists of:
 Fiqh (Islamic jurisprudence)
 Modern Standard Arabic
 Urdu
 International Languages (i.e. Spanish, etc.)
 National Languages (based on the location of the school i.e. German is taught in the German Jamia, English is taught in the Canadian Jamia)
 Tasawwuf
 Ilm al-Hadith (Science of the Sayings of Muhammad)
 Tafsir (Exegesis of the Qur'an)
 History of Science
 Islamic History
 Kalam (logic and argumentation)

Mufti Silsila
The current Mufti Silsila (International Mufti of the Ahmadiyya Muslim Community), Maulana Mubashir Ahmad Kahlon is a graduate of Jamia Ahmadiyya. He is the Head of the Dar al-Ifta' (House of Fatwas) in Rabwah, Pakistan. He appears on many different programmes on Muslim Television Ahmadiyya International for example "Fiqhi Masa'il" (a programme regarding matters of Islamic Jurisprudence (Fiqh) and Rah-e-Huda (a programme presenting beliefs of Ahmadiyya Muslim Community and refuting allegations raised against it).

International campuses

Jamia Ahmadiyya Qadian, India
Jamia Ahmadiyya Qadian formerly known as Madrassa Ahmadiyya was established in the year 1905. This was the first Jamia Ahmadiyya established by the Ahmadiyya Muslim Community and was founded by the founder of Ahmadiyya Muslim community Mirza Ghulam Ahmad. It is still functional and producing missionaries who serve mostly in India, and Middle East.

Jamia Ahmadiyya Rabwah, Pakistan
After the migration from India to Pakistan, a new headquarters were established in Rabwah, Pakistan. A new Jamia Ahmadiyya was established to fulfill the needs of the Community.

Jamia Ahmadiyya United Kingdom 

Jamia Ahmadiyya UK was established in 2005. On 21 October 2012, the World Head of the Ahmadiyya Muslim Jamaat, Mirza Masroor Ahmad, inaugurated the new Jamia Ahmadiyya UK College in Haslemere in Surrey.

Jamia Ahmadiyya Bangladesh 
Jamia Ahmadiyya Bangladesh was established in 2006. It is situated in Dhaka, the capital city of Bangladesh.

Jamia Ahmadiyya International Ghana 

This new International Ahmadiyya University of theology and scholastic sciences (Jamia Ahmadiyya International) was opened in Mankessim Ghana. The town is well known in the history of Ahmadiyyat. In 1921 the first Ahmadi missionary Maulvi Abdul Rahim Nayyar came to Saltpond with the message of Ahmadiyyat for Africa.

This campus was inaugurated on 26 August 2012 by Dr. Maulvi Abdul Wahab Adam (then Ameer and Missionary In charge of Ahmadiyya Muslim Mission Ghana). This institution is hosting students from all over the world for a seven-year Shahid course. For the first year 18 students were selected from eight countries and now 160 students from 24 countries are studying here. The town of Mankessim is known for its Posuban Shrine, busy market and fishing boats. It also serves as a landmark for those travelling between Accra and Cape Coast.

Mr. Fareed Ahmad Naveed was appointed as the first principal of this international campus.

The first group of 26 missionaries graduated from the school on 1 July 2017.

See also

List of Ahmadiyya Muslim Community buildings and structures

Notes

References 
http://alfazl.org/london/20121019.pdf

External links
 Jamia Ahmadiyya UK Official Website
Jamiatul Mubashireen, Ghana Official Website
 Jami'ah Ahmadiyya Canada Official Website
 Documentary on Jamia Ahmadiyya, Rabwah
 Speech on Islam by an American Imam who studied at Jamia Ahmadiyya, Rabwah
 Photos of Jamia Ahmadiyya UK
 official website for Jamia Ahmadiyya International Ghana

Ahmadiyya educational institutions
1928 establishments in India
1898 establishments in India
Islamic universities and colleges in Canada
Islamic universities and colleges in Germany
Islamic universities and colleges in the United Kingdom
Islamic universities and colleges in Nigeria
Islamic universities and colleges in Indonesia
Islamic universities and colleges in India
Islamic universities and colleges in Pakistan
Islamic universities and colleges in Bangladesh